Volutomitra banksi is a species of sea snail, a marine gastropod mollusc in the family Volutomitridae, the mitres.

References

Further reading 
 Powell A W B, New Zealand Mollusca, William Collins Publishers Ltd, Auckland, New Zealand 1979 

Volutomitridae
Gastropods of New Zealand
Gastropods described in 1951